Oreonectes luochengensis is a species of cyprinid of the genus Oreonectes. It was described in 2011 and inhabits China. It is considered harmless to humans and has not been classified on the IUCN Red List.

References

Cyprinid fish of Asia
Freshwater fish of China
Fish described in 2011